Erythrina crista-galli, often known as the cockspur coral tree, is a flowering tree in the family Fabaceae, native to Argentina, Uruguay, southern Brazil and Paraguay.  It is widely planted as a street or garden tree in other countries, notably in California.  
It is known by several common names within South America: ,  (Spanish),  (Portuguese) and the more ambiguous bucaré, to name a few. Its specific epithet crista-galli means "cock's comb" in Latin.

The ceibo is the national tree of Argentina, and its flower the national flower of Argentina and Uruguay. The star HD 63454 is officially named Ceibo after one of the Spanish-language common names.

This species characteristically grows wild in gallery forest ecosystems along watercourses, as well as in swamps and wetlands. In urban settings, it is often planted in parks for its bright red flowers.

Description

The root is a taproot with nodules produced by nitrogen-fixing bacteria. The bacteria live in symbiosis with the tree, facilitating the tree's absorption of nitrogen in return for organic substances which the bacteria need. The tree's trunk is woody with irregular, spiny branches. These branches form a layer without definite form and die after flowering.

Flowers and fruit
The tree flowers in the summer, from October to April in their native South America and from April to October in the northern hemisphere. It usually blooms from November to February. The red flower, arranged in inflorescences of the raceme type, is pentameric, complete, and of bilateral symmetry.  Its calyx is gamosepalous, like a little red thimble. The corolla, like that of other legumes like common beans, is butterfly-shaped; however, the largest petal, called the "standard", is arranged in the lower part. The two of the petals called "wings" are so small that they are practically hidden within the calyx. The remaining two petals partially fuse together on occasion and form the flower's keel or "carina"; this protects its reproductive organs. The androecium consists of ten stamens, one free and nine united by their filaments (gynostemial androecium). The unicarpel gynoecium is welded between the stamens like a knife in its sheath.

The flowers are rich in nectar and are visited by insects, which usually have to crawl underneath the carina and thus pollinate the flowers.

The tree's fruit is a legume, a dry pod a few centimeters in length derived from a single carpel and contains about 8-10 chestnut-brown bean-shaped seeds. The cotyledons are hypogeal, staying underground upon germination.

Cultivation
In cultivation in the United Kingdom this plant has gained the Royal Horticultural Society’s Award of Garden Merit.

Synonyms
Synonyms are as follows:
 Corallodendron crista-galli (L.) Kuntze
 Erythrina crista-galli L. var. hasskarlii Backer
 Erythrina crista-galli L. var. leucochlora Lombardo
 Erythrina fasciculata Benth.
 Erythrina laurifolia Jacq.
 Erythrina pulcherrima Tod.
 Erythrina speciosa Tod. (However, E. speciosa Andrews is a distinct species.)
 Micropteryx crista-galli Walp.
 Micropteryx fasciculata Walp.
 Micropteryx laurifolia Walp.

References
This article draws heavily on the corresponding article in the Spanish-language Wikipedia.

  (1904): Gardening for the Million. Fisher Unwin, London. TXT and HTML fulltexts at Project Gutenberg.

External links

 Día de la Flor Nacional (National Flower Day) - from Argentina's Ministry of Health and Environment website (scientific description, pictures).

crista-galli
Trees of Argentina
Trees of Brazil
Trees of Paraguay
Trees of Uruguay
Taxa named by Carl Linnaeus
National symbols of Argentina
National symbols of Uruguay
Garden plants of South America
Ornamental trees